is a Japanese manga series written and illustrated by Ryo Nakama. A number of one-shot chapters were published in Shueisha's Weekly Shōnen Jump from May to August 2013 before being serialized in the same magazine from October 2013 to October 2017. Its chapters were collected in sixteen tankōbon volumes.

It was adapted into a Flash anime in October 2013, and a series of "manime" (short anime of 30 seconds) were streamed online in 2015, and appeared at Japanese cinemas as intermissions, in Japanese stores and television in 2016. A second season premiered in 2017. A stage play adaptation premiered in Japan in 2016.

Characters

Media

Manga
Nakama first published various one-shot chapters of the series in Shueisha's Weekly Shōnen Jump from May 27 to August 5, 2013. It was then serialized in Weekly Shōnen Jump from October 21, 2013 to October 16, 2017. Various other chapters were published in other Shueisha's magazines; in V Jump on October 21, 2013, in Saikyō Jump on December 26, 2013 and June 4, 2014, in Jump NEXT! from December 27, 2013 to October 13, 2015, and SPUR  on May 20, 2014. Two extra chapters after the main series finished were published in Jump GIGA on November 24, 2017, and another on Shōnen Jump+ digital platform on January 4, 2018. Shueisha collected its chapters into sixteen tankōbon volumes, released from February 4, 2014 to January 4, 2018.

Volume list

Anime
A Flash anime adaptation was announced with the serialized manga debut in October 2013. The four episodes premiered in 2013. A series of "mame anime" (bean anime) or "manime" for short (described as a short anime of approximately 30 seconds in length) debuted online on December 12, 2015, and was available on the Japanese video streaming services GYAO! and dTV. It was also presented by Shochiku at the Shinjuku Piccadilly, MOVIX, and SMT cinemas as intermissions, in the Shosen Book Tower and Shosen Grande bookstores, in Animate stores nationwide. The episodes also appeared on television. More episodes were streamed in April and a DVD was released on April 27, 2016. The entirety of the manime and a "special video" for the series were screening at the Jump Special Anime Festa, held from November 27 and December 4, 2016. A second season of the manime premiered on March 6, 2017.

Stage play
A stage play adaptation ran at the Osaka's ABC Hall for 10 performances from April 20–26, 2016. It starred Takuya Inoue as Isobe Isobē and Yoshihiro Nakayama as Mother. It was directed and scripted by Kenichi Suemitsu with music composed by Shunsuke Wada.

Reception
The series placed 47th out of 50 titles on Da Vinci'''s magazine 15th "Book of the Year" list in 2014. In a poll conducted by Goo Ranking asking fans about what manga they think would be the next "poster manga" of Weekly Shōnen Jump, Isobe Isobē Monogatari placed 9th out of 20 titles with 83 votes. The series ranked third in the first Next Manga Award in the print manga category.

See alsoHigh School Family'', another manga series by the same author

References

External links
 
 
 

Comedy anime and manga
Gathering
Historical anime and manga
Shōnen manga
Shueisha manga